The 2022 Big Ten men's basketball tournament was a postseason men's basketball tournament for the Big Ten Conference of the 2021–22 NCAA Division I men's basketball season which took place March 9–13, 2022. The tournament was held at Gainbridge Fieldhouse in Indianapolis, Indiana. 

Iowa defeated Purdue in the championship game, 75–66, to win the tournament. As a result, they received the conference's automatic bid to the 2022 NCAA tournament.

Seeds
All 14 Big Ten schools participated in the tournament. Teams were seeded by conference record, with a tiebreaker system used to seed teams with identical conference records. The top 10 teams received a first round bye and the top four teams received a double bye. Tiebreaking procedures remained unchanged from the 2021 tournament.

Schedule

*Game times in Eastern Time. #Rankings denote tournament seeding.

Bracket

Game summaries

First round

Second round

Quarterfinals

Semifinals

Championship

All-Tournament Team
 Keegan Murray, Iowa – Big Ten tournament Most Outstanding Player
 Trayce Jackson-Davis, Indiana
 Jordan Bohannon, Iowa
 Jaden Ivey, Purdue
 Trevion Williams, Purdue

References

Tournament
Big Ten men's basketball tournament
Basketball competitions in Indianapolis
College basketball tournaments in Indiana
Big Ten men's basketball tournament
Big Ten men's basketball tournament
2020s in Indianapolis